Ayshan Ahmadova (born 5 May 2000) is an Azerbaijani footballer who plays as a defender for Ankara BB Fomget GS in the Turkish Women's Super League, and the Azerbaijan women's national team.

Club career 
In April 2021, Ahmadova moved to Turkey, and joined the Gaziantep-based club ALG Spor to play in the 2020–21 Turkish Women's Football League. The next season, she transferred to Çaykur Rizespor. In October 2022, she signed with  Ankara BB Fomget GS.

International goals

See also 
List of Azerbaijan women's international footballers

References 

2000 births
Living people
Women's association football defenders
Azerbaijani women's footballers
Azerbaijan women's international footballers
FC Okzhetpes players
Azerbaijani expatriate footballers
Azerbaijani expatriate sportspeople in Kazakhstan
Expatriate women's footballers in Kazakhstan
Azerbaijani expatriate sportspeople in Turkey
Expatriate women's footballers in Turkey
ALG Spor players
Turkish Women's Football Super League players
Çaykur Rizespor (women's football) players
Fomget Gençlik ve Spor players